Purila is a village in Rapla Parish, Rapla County in northwestern Estonia.

Purila Manor is located in the village.

References

 

Villages in Rapla County